Capric acid, also known as decanoic acid or decylic acid, is a saturated fatty acid, medium-chain fatty acid (MCFA), and carboxylic acid. Salts and esters of decanoic acid are called caprates or decanoates. The term capric acid is derived from the Latin "caper / capra" (goat) because the sweaty, unpleasant smell of the compound is reminiscent of goats.

Occurrence
Capric acid occurs naturally in coconut oil (about 10%) and palm kernel oil (about 4%), otherwise it is uncommon in typical seed oils. It is found in the milk of various mammals and to a lesser extent in other animal fats. 

Two other acids are named after goats: caproic acid (a C6:0 fatty acid) and caprylic acid (a C8:0 fatty acid). Along with capric acid, these total 15% in goat milk fat.

Production
Capric acid can be prepared from oxidation of the primary alcohol decanol by using chromium trioxide oxidant under acidic conditions.

Neutralization of capric acid or saponification of its triglyceride esters with sodium hydroxide yields sodium caprate, .  This salt is a component of some types of soap.

Uses
Capric acid is used in the manufacture of esters for artificial fruit flavors and perfumes. It is also used as an intermediate in chemical syntheses. It is used in organic synthesis and industrially in the manufacture of perfumes, lubricants, greases, rubber, dyes, plastics, food additives and pharmaceuticals.

Pharmaceuticals
Caprate ester prodrugs of various pharmaceuticals are available. Since capric acid is a fatty acid, forming a salt or ester with a drug will increase its lipophilicity and its affinity for adipose tissue. Since distribution of a drug from fatty tissue is usually slow, one may develop a long-acting injectable form of a drug (called a depot injection) by using its caprate form. Some examples of drugs available as a caprate ester include nandrolone, fluphenazine, bromperidol, and haloperidol.

Effects
Capric acid acts as a non-competitive AMPA receptor antagonist at therapeutically relevant concentrations, in a voltage- and subunit-dependent manner, and this is sufficient to explain its antiseizure effects. This direct inhibition of excitatory neurotransmission by capric acid in the brain contributes to the anticonvulsant effect of the MCT ketogenic diet. Decanoic acid and the AMPA receptor antagonist drug perampanel act at separate sites on the AMPA receptor, and so it is possible that they have a cooperative effect at the AMPA receptor, suggesting that perampanel and the ketogenic diet could be synergistic.

Capric acid may be responsible for the mitochondrial proliferation associated with the ketogenic diet, and that this may occur via PPARγ receptor agonism and its target genes involved in mitochondrial biogenesis.
Complex I activity of the electron transport chain is substantially elevated by decanoic acid treatment.

It should however be noted that orally ingested medium chain fatty acids would be very rapidly degraded by first-pass metabolism by being taken up in the liver via the portal vein, and are quickly metabolized via coenzyme A intermediates through β-oxidation and the citric acid cycle to produce carbon dioxide, acetate and ketone bodies. Whether the ketones β-hydroxybutryate and acetone have direct antiseizure activity is unclear.

See also
 List of saturated fatty acids
 List of carboxylic acids
 Undecylic acid
 Pelargonic acid, a medium-chain fatty acid, also with antiseizure activity

References

Alkanoic acids
Fatty acids
Foul-smelling chemicals
Triglycerides